Pyramidellinae is a taxonomic subfamily of minute sea snails, marine gastropod mollusks in the family Pyramidellidae, the pyrams and their allies.

Taxonomy 
It is one of eleven recognised subfamilies of the marine gastropod family Pyramidellidae (according to the taxonomy of Ponder & Lindberg, 1997), which are as follows: Odostomiinae, Turbonillinae, Chrysallidinae, Cingulininae, Cyclostremellinae, Sayellinae, Syrnolinae, Eulimellinae, Pyramidellinae, Odostomellinae and Tiberiinae.

2005 taxonomy 
In the taxonomy of Bouchet & Rocroi (2005), this subfamily consists of the following tribes, adding the tribe Sayellini containing only two genera Sayella and Petitella.

Tribe Pyramidellini Gray, 1840
Tribe Sayellini Wise, 1996 - former subfamily Sayellinae

Genera 
According to Schander, Van Aartsen & Corgen (1999) there are 12 genera within the Pyramidellinae:

tribe Pyramidellini
 Callolongchaeus Dall, 1903: synonym of Longchaeus Mörch, 1875
 Creonella Wade, 1917
 Lacrimiforma Sohl, 1963
 Locklinia Bartsch, 1955
 Longchaeus Mörch, 1875
 Milda Dall & Bartsch, 1904
 Otopleura Fischer, 1885
 Pharcidella Dall, 1889: synonym of Longchaeus Mörch, 1875
 Pyramidella Gray, 1840 - type genus of the tribe family Pyramidellidae
 Triptychus Mörch, 1875
 Urambella Laseron, 1959: synonym of Pyramidella Lamarck, 1799
 Voluspa (gastropod) Dall & Bartsch, 1904;: synonym of Longchaeus Mörch, 1875
tribe Sayellini

References

External links 
 

Pyramidellidae
Taxa named by John Edward Gray